Polarimeter to Unify the Corona and Heliosphere (PUNCH) is a future mission by NASA to study the unexplored region from the middle of the solar corona out to 1 AU from the Sun. PUNCH will consist of a constellation of four microsatellites that through continuous 3D deep-field imaging, will observe the corona and heliosphere as elements of a single, connected system. The four microsatellites were initially scheduled to be launched in October 2023, but they have since been moved to an April 2025 launch in rideshare with SPHEREx.

On 20 June 2019, NASA announced that PUNCH and TRACERS were the winning candidates to become the next missions in the agency's Small Explorer program (SMEX).

PUNCH is led by Craig Edward DeForest at the Southwest Research Institute (SwRI) in Boulder, Colorado. Including launch costs, PUNCH is being funded for no more than US$165 million.

Mission 

The stated primary objective of PUNCH is "to fully discern the cross-scale physical processes, from microscale turbulence to the evolution of global-scale structures, that unify the solar corona and heliosphere". In other words, the mission aims to understand how the solar corona becomes the solar wind.

The two specific objectives are to understand how coronal structures become the ambient solar wind, and to understand the dynamic evolution of transient structures in the young solar wind. The Principal Investigator, Craig Edward DeForest from Southwest Research Institute (SwRI), thinks that such closer study will also lead to a better understanding of the causes of solar weather events like coronal mass ejections (CMEs), which can damage satellites and disrupt electrical grids and power systems on Earth.

The more we understand what drives space weather and its interaction with the Earth and lunar systems, the more we can mitigate its effects – including safeguarding astronauts and technology crucial to NASA's Artemis program to the Moon.

Instruments 

The mission configuration consists of a constellation of four observatories, each carrying one primary instrument.
 The Narrow Field Imager (NFI) sits on only one spacecraft, and is an externally occulted visible-light coronagraph.
 The Wide Field Imagers (WFIs) are side-looking heliospheric imagers with planar-corral baffles that sit on the remaining 3 spacecraft.
 The NFI spacecraft also carries a student-built instrument, the Student Thermal Energetic Activity Monitor (STEAM).  STEAM is a solid-state X-ray spectrometer that views the entire Sun as a point source, to study the physics of coronal heating and solar flares.

The fields of view (FoV) of the 3 WFIs overlap slightly with each other and with the NFI, and the instruments' operation is synchronized. The instruments operate through polarized Thomson-scatter imaging of the transition from corona to heliosphere. PUNCH integrates images from its constellation of small satellites into a global composite after each orbit, covering ~6 orders of magnitude dynamic range. Through a stream of these images, PUNCH achieves 3D feature localization and accurate deep field imaging. The mission builds on Cyclone Global Navigation Satellite System (CYGNSS) experience with smallsat constellations.

Collaborations 
SwRI is collaborating with the Naval Research Laboratory (NRL) and the Rutherford Appleton Laboratory in Oxfordshire, England, United Kingdom.

PUNCH, which will operate in low Earth orbit, will work in synergy with NASA's Parker Solar Probe and the ESA's Solar Orbiter.

See also 

Explorer program

References 

Solar space observatories
Proposed space probes
Solar telescopes
Space weather
NASA space probes
2025 in spaceflight
Explorers Program